Carmine Appice is a 1981 album by Carmine Appice and was released on the Pasha Records label.

Reception 
allmusic  Actually titled "Rockers" at allmusic

Track listing

 "Have You Heard" 4:08 (Carmine Appice, Duane Hitchings, Pete French)
 "Keep On Rolling" 4:24 (Appice, Danny Johnson)
 "Paint It Black" 3:44 (Mick Jagger, Keith Richards)
 "Blue Cafe" 4:03 (Appice, James Ciamond)
 "Sweet Senorita" 3:04 (Appice, French, Johnson)
 "Drum City Rocker (Ballad of Drum City Surfer Girls)" 3:20 (Appice, Vinnie Cusano)
 "Hollywood Heartbeat" 3:58 (Appice, Cyril Cianflone)
 "Be My Baby" 3:52 (Jeff Barry, Ellie Greenwich, Phil Spector)
 "Am I Losing You" 3:50 (Appice, French, Ron Leejack)
 "Drums, Drums, Drums" 3:13 (Appice, Richard Podolor)

Personnel
 Carmine Appice - Drums, Percussion, Lead Vocals
 Danny Johnson - Guitars
 Duane Hitchings - Keyboards
 Jay Davis - Bass
 The Rockers - Background Vocals

Source: Carmine Appice "Carmine Appice" album cover

Credits

Engineer - Bill Cooper
Producer - Richard Podolor

Chart performance

References

1981 albums
Pasha Records albums
Albums produced by Richard Podolor